Ichigo is the Japanese word for strawberry (苺).

Ichigo may also refer to:

People 
 Ichigo Rinahamu, Japanese idol, current member of CY8ER
 Ichigo Takano, Japanese manga artist

Fictional characters 
 Ichigo Hoshimiya, main character in Aikatsu!
 Ichigo Kurosaki, main character in Bleach 
 Ichigo Momomiya, main character in Tokyo Mew Mew 
 Ichigo Morino, character in Please Teacher! 
 Ichigo Amano, main character in Yumeiro Patissiere 
 Ichigo, character in Darling in the Franxx
 Ichigo Moesaki, character in Seiyu's Life!
 Kamen Raidā Ichigō or Kamen Rider 1, main character in Kamen Rider

Media 
 Ichigo 100% or Strawberry 100%, a Japanese media franchise
 Ichigo Mashimaro or Strawberry Marshmallow, a Japanese media franchise

Other uses 
 Ichigo Ichie, Japanese kaiseki restaurant 
 Ichigo Inc., a Japanese sustainable infrastructure company
 Operation Ichi-Go, a military operation in World War II

Japanese feminine given names